Tullyallen may refer to:
Tullyallen, County Armagh, a townland in County Armagh, Northern Ireland
Tullyallen, County Louth, a village and townland in County Louth, Ireland
Tullyallen, County Meath, a civil parish in County Meath, Ireland
Tullyallen, County Monaghan, a townland in County Monaghan, Ireland
Tullyallen, County Tyrone, a townland in County Tyrone, Northern Ireland

See also
Tulliallan Castle, a large house in Kincardine, Fife, Scotland